Adrian Geldenhuys (born 11 July 1964) is a former South African rugby union player.

Playing career
Geldenhuys made his provincial debut for Northern Transvaal in 1987. He had a very successful first provincial season with Northern Transvaal, winning the 1987 Currie Cup title and being nominated as one of the South African Players of the Year, the first player ever to be voted for this honour in his first year of first class rugby. In 1990, Geldenhuys relocated to the Eastern Cape and continued his career with Eastern Province. Geldenhuys made his test debut for South Africa on 15 August 1992 against the All Blacks at Ellis Park. He then played against Australia the following week and toured with the Springboks to France and England, playing in two tests against France, as well as seven tour matches.

Test history

See also
List of South Africa national rugby union players – Springbok no. 564

References

1964 births
Living people
South African rugby union players
South Africa international rugby union players
Blue Bulls players
Eastern Province Elephants players
People from Cederberg Local Municipality
Rugby union players from the Western Cape
Rugby union locks